Alveolar artery may refer to:
 Superior alveolar artery (disambiguation), which divides into 2 parts:
Anterior superior alveolar artery
Posterior superior alveolar artery
 Inferior alveolar artery